The National University of Misiones (in Spanish: Universidad Nacional de Misiones, UNaM) is a public university in Argentina. It has a publishing house and a radio station, LRH301 FM Universidad Nacional de Misiones, that streams in Ogg Vorbis format.

History
The university founded by the Argentine law 20.286 on April 16, 1973, as part of the Taquini plan, a program of reorganization of higher education in Argentina. This would involve the foundation of the universities of Jujuy, La Pampa, Lomas de Zamora, Entre Ríos, Luján, Catamarca, Salta, San Juan, San Luis and Santiago del Estero, to form more than 11.000 pupils, on border locations with Paraguay and Brazil.

In 2021, the University awarded a posthumous "honoris causa" prize to the writer Eduardo Galeano.

Faculties
Arts School - Oberá
Engineering School - Oberá
Economic Sciences School - Posadas
Exact, Chemical and Natural Sciences School - Posadas
Humanities and Social Sciences School - Posadas
Forest Sciences School - Eldorado

Alumni
 Maurice Closs, Argentine National Senator
 Alberto Garrido, philosophy student, Argentine–Venezuelan journalist and political analyst 
 Asa Cristina Laurell, sociologist and Mexican Under Secretary of Health
 Mercedes Margarita Oviedo, Argentine National Senator and Vice Governor
 Carlos Rovira, chemical engineer and Governor of Misiones.

See also
List of Argentine universities

References

External links

Science and Education in Argentina
Argentine Higher Education Official Site
Official Site
Universidad Nacional de Misiones FM Radio (streaming in Ogg Vorbis)

1973 establishments in Argentina
Argentine national universities
Educational institutions established in 1973
Forestry education
Universities in Misiones Province